Here Comes the Queen is a British sitcom pilot that was written by Jeremy Lloyd and David Croft. It starred Les Dennis and Wendy Richard. Dennis and Richard play a brother and sister who discover they are heirs to the throne of a small (fictitious) country in the former Soviet Union. A single pilot episode was produced, but never broadcast.

Cast
Les Dennis as Percy Wills
Wendy Richard as Lillian Wills
Philip Madoc as Karminsky
Burt Kwouk as Mr Chan

Home release
A DVD was planned to be released shortly after the pilot's broadcast. However, since the pilot never aired, the DVD was scrapped.

References

2008 television specials
Television pilots not picked up as a series
British television specials
Unaired television pilots